Tresticklan National Park is located in the municipality of Dals-Ed in northwestern Dalsland, Sweden, along the Norwegian border. "Trestickel" means "trident", possibly a reference to the shape of Lake Stora Tresticklan. This national park contains one of the few remaining areas of old-growth forest in southern Scandinavia. The park's highest point is the Orshöjden (276 m.a.sl).

See also 
 Bråtane
 Lake Stora Le
 Råbocken

References

External links 

 Sweden's National Parks: Tresticklan National Park from the Swedish Environmental Protection Agency

Geography of Västra Götaland County
National parks of Sweden
Protected areas established in 1996
1996 establishments in Sweden
Tourist attractions in Västra Götaland County